Revolutionary Party is the name of several political parties, including:

Active parties

Former parties

See also
 Revolutionary Communist Party
 Revolutionary Socialist Party
 Workers Revolutionary Party
 People's Revolutionary Party Incident in South Korea